Cervia is a seaside resort town in the province of Ravenna, located in the northern Italian region of Emilia-Romagna.

Cervia is a major seaside resort in Emilia-Romagna, North Italy. Its population was 28,700 at the 2018 census.

History 
The oldest human discovery in the area occurred in the Montaletto hamlet: most likely it is a Bronze Age shepherds' camp dating back to about 3,000 - 1,000 B.C. The salt marshes were probably already active in the Etruscan age, as findings during urban planning works carried out in recent years would indicate. It is possible that lodgings, or perhaps settlements, existed for salt workers, even seasonal ones; the findings indicate a certain population density already in the first century BC. Until the Roman age, the city kept the name of "Ficocle", but its exact location is not known.  

Later the centre was rebuilt in a more secure position, in the Salina. This medieval city grew until it was provided with three fortified entrances, a Palaces of Priors, seven churches and a castle (Rocca) which, according to the legend, was built by Emperor Frederick Barbarossa. The name also changed from Ficocle to Cervia, probably referring to the Acervi, great amounts of salt left in the local evaporation ponds. After a long series of events, it became part of the Papal States.

As time passed, the salt pond turned into a marsh, and on 9 November 1697, Pope Innocent XII ordered it to be rebuilt in a safer location. The new city had huge silos for the storage of salt, containing up to 13,000 tons.

Cervia is also mentioned in Dante's Divine Comedy (Inferno, Canto XXVII, lines 40–42).

Town information 
Nowadays Cervia is a seaside resort on the Adriatic Riviera thanks to its  shore characterised by sandy beaches.
Unlike its neighbour Cesenatico, the buildings are subject to strict urban regulations, favouring the conservation of the pine forest and green areas between each new construction.

Cervia has a large pine forest, about 260 hectares and includes the areas of Milano Marittima, Cervia, Pinarella and Tagliata. A project with the local authority of ARPA is active for the control of water, at various points between the beach in Milano Marittima and that of Pinarella. The results that are obtained show that the water quality is such that guaranteed the city the blue flag of the Foundation for Environmental Education for the ninth consecutive year (since 1997). The levels of these wastewaters have always been excellent in recent years, except some small survey of 2004 and 2002 that triggered the alarm and were provided other controls, which have verified the quality of the water, immediately returned to levels within the normal range.

Housing prices in Cervia ranked second highest in the Emilia Romagna in a 2009 research, only after Bologna. With the development of the neighbourhood Milano Marittima, the presence of nightclubs and outdoor dances were banished from Cervia centre, in order to respect the comfort of residents and tourists.

In Cervia, they are already operating several cycling routes. In fact, the city is also famous for its large number of bicycles around the town, especially during summer.

It's heavily influenced by the presence of sports, art, and cuisine.

Cervia was Italy's first city to host an IRONMAN Triathlon, drawing world-class athletes from all over the world.

Tortelli verdi is a typical food in Cervia.

Main sights 
 The Cathedral (Santa Maria Assunta), built in 1699–1702
 The Museum of Salt
 The Communal Palace
 St. Michael Tower

Transportation 
The city is served by the road Strada statale 16 Adriatica or Romea South. It is possible reach the Italian A14 highway at Cesena (15 km) and Rimini (24 km). Cervia is located about 103 km south of Bologna, 311 km far from Milan and 359 km from Rome.

Notable people 
 

Maria Goia (1878–1924), politician, feminist, and trade unionist

Twin towns/sister cities 
  Southampton, New York, United States
  Monterey, United States
  Jelenia Góra, Poland
  Mahón, Spain
  Cluj-Napoca, Romania
  Aalen, (Germany)

Gallery

See also 
Diocese of Cervia

Notes and references

External links 

 Cervia Municipality 
 Official tourist information site of Cervia, Milano Marittima, Pinarella and Tagliata

Cities and towns in Emilia-Romagna